Chimera is a Live action role-playing (LARP) convention held annually every August in Auckland, New Zealand.  The convention is supported by the New Zealand Live Action Role Playing Society, and has run annually since 2008.  It is the largest event of its type in New Zealand, attracting over 150 people.  It does not have guests of honour.

The convention supports different styles of play, including live-combat and theatre-style games. It hosts a single large "flagship" game to provide a unifying experience for attendees.

List of conventions
 2008: Motu Moana, Auckland (Flagship: Flight of the Hindenberg)
 2009: Motu Moana, Auckland (Flagship: The Great Exhibition)
 2010: Motu Moana, Auckland (Flagship: A Town Called Refuge)
 2011: Motu Moana, Auckland (Flagship: The Gordian Knot)
 2012: Motu Moana, Auckland (Flagship: Happily Ever After)
 2013: Motu Moana, Auckland (Flagship: The Rose and the Dragon)
 2014: Motu Moana, Auckland (no flagship)

External links
 Official site.
 "Having a larp", 20/20 report about Chimera 2009
 "Playing the Larp Part", NZ Life & Leisure, November 2013

Defunct gaming conventions